Nancy Davidson may refer to:

 Nancy Davidson (artist) (born 1943)
 Nancy E. Davidson, American oncologist